Pterostichus agonus is a species of woodland ground beetle in the family Carabidae. It is found in Europe and Northern Asia (excluding China) and North America.

Subspecies
These two subspecies belong to the species Pterostichus agonus:
 Pterostichus agonus agonus G.Horn, 1880
 Pterostichus agonus averenskii O. & E.Berlov, 1997

References

Further reading

 

Pterostichus
Articles created by Qbugbot
Beetles described in 1880